Mario Joseph Korbel (March 22, 1882 – March 31, 1954) was a Czech-American sculptor.

Biography
He was born in Osík, Bohemia (now Czech Republic) on March 22, 1882 to a clergyman, Joseph Korbel and his wife Katherina Dolezal Korbel. He began studying sculpture in his homeland, continuing his studies after moving to the United States at age 18. He returned to Europe and continued his studies in Berlin, Munich and Paris.

He was one of a dozen sculptors invited to compete  in the Pioneer Woman statue competition in 1927, which he failed to win.

Korbel was a member of the National Sculpture Society. He was elected into the National Academy of Design in 1937 as an Associate member and became a full Academician in 1944.

He died March 31, 1954 in Manhattan, New York City.

Works
His sculpture can be found at:
Brookgreen Gardens, Murrells Inlet, South Carolina
Art Institute of Chicago
Lyman Allyn Museum, New London, Connecticut
Museum of Fine Arts of St Petersburg, St Petersburg, Florida
Honolulu Academy of Fine Arts, Honolulu, Hawaii
Fogg Museum. Harvard University. Cambridge, Massachusetts
Caramoor Rosen House, Katonah, New York
Cranbrook Educational Community, Bloomfield Hills, Michigan
Cleveland Museum of Art, Cleveland, Ohio
Metropolitan Museum of Art, New York City
National Gallery of Canada, Ottawa, Canada
Illinois Monument, Kennesaw Mountain National Battlefield Park, Marietta, Georgia
Racine Heritage Museum, Racine, Wisconsin
"Oakland Cemetery, Iowa City, Iowa
Newark Museum, Newark, New Jersey
McPhee Memorial, Denver, Colorado
Ezekiel W. Cullen Building, University of Texas, Austin, Texas
Alma Mater statue, Universidad de La Habana, Havana, Cuba (1919)
Bohemian National Cemetery, Chicago, Illinois

as well as at several sites in the Czech Republic.

As a medalist Korbel designed a medal struck by the Medallic Art Company New York about Nazi Germany occupying Bohemia and Moravia. That medal was available at the unfinished  pavilion of Czechoslovakia of the 1939 New York World's Fair as an award for contributions to the Czech Resistance.

References

1882 births
1954 deaths
Austro-Hungarian emigrants to the United States
American people of Bohemian descent
20th-century American sculptors
20th-century American male artists
American male sculptors
People from Svitavy District